AO World is an electrical retailer based in Bolton, England. It operates in the United Kingdom (ao.com), and previously operated in Germany (ao.de) and the Netherlands (ao.nl), specialising in household appliances and electricals. It is listed on the London Stock Exchange.

History
The company was founded under the name Appliances Online by John Roberts in 2000. Prior to this, during a conversation in a Bolton pub, a close friend bet Roberts £1 that he could not set up his own company and disrupt the white goods market by selling appliances online.

As well as selling directly to consumers, the company also sold kitchen appliances on behalf of other retailers such as Next, House of Fraser and B&Q. In 2009 the company acquired the distribution business Expert Logistics enabling end-to-end control of their operation.

In 2013, Appliances Online rebranded to AO.com, which included a redesign of their logo to its current state. In the same year, the company reached one million likes on Facebook and aired their first television advertisement. AO.com was also presented with three awards at the 2013 Retail Week and Drapers ceremony: the Overall Award for Excellence, Best Use of Social Media and Best Pure Play Etailer. They were also awarded fourth place in The Times 100 Best Mid-Size Companies to Work For award and held this position the following year.

In February 2014, the company was floated on the London Stock Exchange as AO World. The IPO allowed the company to raise funds for European expansion and AO's first overseas website, AO.de, launched in Germany later that same year. At the 2014 Retail Week Awards, AO.com won Best Customer Experience, Best use of Content and Best use of Social Media.

In 2015, AO.com announced plans for their second overseas website, AO.nl In the same year, a number of AO employees completed a Germany to Bolton bike ride to raise money for a new playground. AO.com also took home the Employer of the Year award at Retail Week 2015.

In 2016, to support its European expansion, AO opened its 84,000 square metre headquarters in Bergheim, Germany. AO.com also expanded its distribution facility in Crewe with the addition of the Omega building, giving the company 740,000 square feet of warehouse space. AO.com also won the Customer Experience Initiative award at Retail Week 2016.

In 2017, the company announced it would sponsor the 11th series of ITV show, Britain's Got Talent. It also announced that it would extend its sponsorship with Lancashire County Cricket Club. It was also reported that company founder, John Roberts would step down as CEO, remaining on the board as Founder and Executive Director. The former COO, Steve Caunce, took over as CEO. In March, the company announced that it had raised £50 million through share placing to support plans for further growth. The retailer also announced that it was to open a recycling plant in Telford, Shropshire.

In January 2018, the retailer, reported that it had opened a new office in Manchester city centre, which was to be home to the business's in-house multimedia, IT and sales teams. In April, the business announced that it had become one of only twenty businesses in the world to have received over 100,000 Trustpilot reviews. In July, the business launched its new brand campaign, Delivering Tomorrow. It was also reported that it had committed to building a second major fridge recycling facility in the south east of England. The company also confirmed that it had completed the acquisition of the online phone retailer Mobile Phones Direct for £32.5 million as it looks to expand its offering in the mobile phone sector.

In January 2019, it was announced that Steve Caunce would step down as CEO, John Roberts would reassume the role.

AO's recycling plant in Telford processed its millionth fridge in July 2019.

AO Mobile launched in August 2019, offering all UK mobile networks and all handset manufacturers. Roberts described the launch as "a game changer for mobile phone customers".

In August 2019, AO launched AO Finance in partnership with consumer finance provider Newday. AO Finance offers a market-leading rolling credit facility that gives more customers access to essential products through affordable finance.

In October 2019, AO's plastic plant was unveiled as the company announced its ambition to use its recycling capabilities to ultimately make new fridges from the recycled materials extracted from old ones.

Announcing its interim financial results in November 2019, Roberts confirmed that AO would close its operation in the Netherlands to focus on its German business. Roberts explained that the team did not have the bandwidth to fix both markets but remained committed to future international expansion once the German model was proven.

In April 2020, AO Business continued to grow and after only six months in the housebuilders sector, secured over 12,000 building plots. Following a strategic review in July 2022, AO exited the housebuilder market to focus on business to business sectors that better fitted its model. This includes kitchen manufacturers and retailers such as its partnership with Homebase, which launched in January 2022.

In September 2020, AO announced that it would be the new headline sponsor of Manchester Arena. The announcement came as operators ASM Global were submitting a planning application for phase one of its ambitious redevelopment. In a five-year deal, the rebranded AO Arena would see live events resuming once the current COVID-19 related restrictions on venues are lifted.

In October 2020, AO announced plans to open five 'stores-within-a-store' with  Tesco as part of a six-month partnership trial with the supermarket. It ended the trial in July 2022.

Following the launch of its unique Value Creation Plan in 2020, an all employee long-term incentive that rewards exceptional value creation, AO announced a restructuring of the plan in September 2022, which will see the scheme begin funding at a share price of £1.

In June 2022, AO closed its German business, which accounted for around 10% of the group's revenue. The following month, AO successfully completed a planned £40m capital raise to strengthen its balance sheet and increase liquidity back to historic levels.

In Autumn 2022, AO appointed two new non-executive directors to its board. Former Pets at Home Chief Executive, Peter Pritchard, joined in September and Pret a Manger Global Chief Digital Officer joined in November 2022.

At its half year financial results in November 2022, AO upgraded its full year profit expectations following its strategic pivot to focus on cash generation and profitability, which included reducing its cost base by £30m.

In the same month, AO announced it was the new headline sponsor of Manchester Thunder, the current and four time Netball Super League champions.

Operations

The company now occupies  offices and is based in Bolton. The company was named as 63rd in the Sunday Times 'Best Companies to Work For' list in 2011, and received the award for Best Customer Service Operation at the 2011 European Call Centre & Customer Service Awards. In 2012, the company was named 5th in the Sunday Times' list, and in 2013 climbed to 4th, retaining this position in 2014.

In 2019, AO Tech won the Team of the Year – Large Organisations award in the Computing Rising Star Awards.

Advertising
The company launched a new advertising campaign on 3 May 2013 to mark the rebrand of the business from Appliances Online to ao.com. The first advert follows a fictional new employee called ‘Dave’ and his over-enthusiastic inductor on his first day at work. A further advert was aired showing ‘Barry Catchpole’. Its adverts feature a version of the Ramones song "Blitzkrieg Bop" in which the words "Hey! Ho! Let's go!" are reinterpreted as "A.O. Let's go!".

In May 2020, AO launched a new advertising campaign with an advert showing how Britain's homes were working harder than ever whilst many people were forced to stay home due to the COVID-19 pandemic. The advert demonstrated the hundreds of thousands of electricals AO have in stock ready for next day delivery across the UK.

References

External links
 

2000 establishments in the United Kingdom
Online retailers of the United Kingdom
Companies based in Bolton
Retail companies established in 2000
Internet properties established in 2000
Companies listed on the London Stock Exchange